Gnade means mercy, grace in German and may refer to
 Mercy (2012 film), a German drama film
Front ohne Gnade, a German television series
Adam Gnade, American musician and author
Lieutenant Hartwig Gnade, leader of the First, Second, and Third Platoons of the Reserve Police Battalion 101, of Nazi Germany